Just Dance 2014 is a 2013 dance rhythm game developed by Ubisoft Paris, Ubisoft Milan, Ubisoft Reflections, Ubisoft Bucharest, Ubisoft Pune, Ubisoft Montpellier and Ubisoft Barcelona and published by Ubisoft. The fifth main installment of the Just Dance series, it was announced at Ubisoft's E3 2013 press event, and released for PlayStation 3, Xbox 360, Wii, and Wii U on 9 October 2013, and for PlayStation 4 and Xbox One as a launch title on 15 November and 22 November 2013 respectively.

The game introduced several new features to the franchise, including expanded second screen support for Wii U and Xbox platforms, the ability to record and share video clips of gameplay on supported platforms, and online multiplayer through the "World Dance Floor" mode.

Gameplay

As in previous installments, players must mimic the routine of an on-screen dancer to a chosen song, scoring points based on their accuracy. The game requires motion controllers to dance (Wii Remotes on Wii and Wii U, PlayStation Move on PlayStation 3, a choice of either PlayStation Move or PlayStation Camera on PlayStation 4, and Kinect on Xbox 360 and Xbox One).

Selected songs now feature "On Stage" modes—routines in which one player dances in a lead role while others perform as backup dancers. Lyrics are displayed above the dancers in this mode instead of the bottom left, in order to focus on singing along. The Xbox One version also include an alternate routine for "Kiss You" (serving as a classic routine in that said version instead of the original four player routine, which has been the classic routine on other consoles, in which is now the alternate routine in that said version) that can be played by up to six players at once. However, Dance Crew routines are four players only in that said version. The "AutoDance" feature allows users to record footage of their gameplay, which can then be uploaded to the Just Dance website or shared on social networks. The "Karaoke" feature allows players to use connected microphones to sing along to all of the lyrics on-screen. Players also earn bonus "Mojo" points for singing along. "Gold Moves" in Mashups have made its return after its absence from the previous game, Just Dance 4.

Online multiplayer was added by means of a ghost data system, as well a new mode known as "World Dance Floor"—in which players compete against others simultaneously on the same song in a massively multiplayer setting. Players can join in at any time with 8 player parties, except for the Wii version, compare their performance against other players during and after each song, and increase their level by playing more often. Occasionally, players can vote to decide on the next song.

Additional second screen features are available on the Wii U and Xbox One versions of the game using a Wii U GamePad or Xbox SmartGlass; users can manage playlists, and manipulate gameplay and routines in the "Party Master" mode, which is a revamped version of the "Puppet Master" mode from Just Dance 4, with dance moves no longer tied to all entries of the Just Dance series, and are free to choose any of the four randomized dance moves, as well as the ability to switch songs at certain times. The GamePad's camera can also be used to record AutoDance footage and serve as a microphone for karaoke.

All online services for the game were discontinued on 19 November 2018.

Soundtrack
There are a total of 50 songs in the main soundtrack.

Downloadable content
Additional songs and routines for Just Dance 2014 were released as downloadable content. Some DLC songs were re-issues of songs released as DLC for previous editions.

The game offers downloadable content songs for the player to download. One of them is free of charge.

All of the DLC songs are no longer available for the Wii since the Wii Shop Channel's closure. The DLC songs will be available on the Wii U's Nintendo eShop until its closure on 27 March 2023.

Reception
IGN praised Just Dance 2014s continued focus on being a casual party game in comparison to the more sophisticated nature of Dance Central, acknowledging its "accessible, silly, and endearingly creative" routines, the "On Stage" routines providing "a stage for particularly ostentatious dancers to shine" that "[brims] with sexual tension, an essential element of any classic party game from Truth or Dare to Twister", and increasing production values over previous installments, but also noting that its soundtrack was skewed more towards recent music. It was also noted that the World Dance Floor mode could help players who cannot decide on a song due to the game's large soundtrack. In conclusion, giving the game a 7.9 out of 10, IGN explained that "Just Dance 2014 exerts no pressure, and demands no skill. It just invites you to have fun with it, whoever you are and whatever music you like. It’s wildly silly, creative and colourful, relying on daft, characterful choreography and to evoke a party atmosphere that puts everyone at ease."

References

2013 video games
Dance video games
Fitness games
Just Dance (video game series)
Kinect games
Music video games
PlayStation 3 games
PlayStation 4 games
PlayStation Move-compatible games
Ubisoft games
Video games developed in Italy
Video games developed in France
Wii games
Wii U games
Wii U eShop games
Xbox 360 games
Xbox One games